Major General Otto Ludvig Beckman (29 April 1856 – 27 June 1909) was a Swedish Navy officer and commanding officer of the Swedish Coastal Artillery. He was assassinated during czar Nicholas II's visit to Stockholm in 1909.

Career
Beckman began his career as a sub-lieutenant in the Swedish Navy in 1876 and was promoted to lieutenant in 1881 and captain in 1888. He was a teacher at the Royal Swedish Naval Academy from 1889 to 1891 and was head of the Naval Mine Department at the naval station in Karlskrona from 1891 to 1901. Beckman was promoted to commander of second rank in 1897 and first rank in 1900. He was a member of the Executive Board of the Fleet's Retirement Fund from 1899. Beckman was promoted to colonel and commander of Karlskrona Coastal Artillery Regiment (KA 2) as well as artillery commander of Karlskrona Fortress in 1902. In 1907, Beckman was promoted to major general and became commander of the Coastal Artillery. He was a long-standing member of Karlskrona City Council and deputy chairman of the city treasury.

He was a member of the Defence Committee in 1907. Beckman was also an honorary member of the Royal Swedish Society of Naval Sciences.

Assassination
During Czar Nicholas II's visit to Stockholm in 1909 the anarchist Hjalmar Wång tried to assassinate the czar. He failed, however, and killed Beckman instead. It was after a banquet at the Royal Palace, when Beckman and his colleagues made a short visit to the Grand Hôtel. Ten minutes after midnight on the 27 June he walked, dressed in parade uniform, through Kungsträdgården. There he met Wång who shot him in the back. Right after, the 22-year-old Wång shot himself in the head twice. Wång died the next morning from his injuries. Commander P. Dahlgren who was walking with Beckman escaped without injures. The passer-by, feldsher Levander, was hit by a bullet but survived. Beckman was buried on the 2 July 1909 at Norra begravningsplatsen in Solna Municipality.

Personal life
Beckman was married to Olga Maria Högsted (born 1861). They had three sons, lieutenant colonel Per Evald Ottocar Beckman (1885–1962), commander Sven Alfred Ottocar Beckman (1887–1962), and district judge Herbert Ottokar Beckman (1893-1981), and one daughter, rector Olga Elsa Beckman (1888–1975).

Dates of rank
1876 – Underlöjtnant (Navy)
1881 – Sub-lieutenant
1888 – Lieutenant
1897 – Lieutenant commander
1900 – Commander
1902 – Colonel (Coastal Artillery)
1907 – Major general

Awards and decorations
   Commander 1st Class of the Order of the Sword (16 June 1908)
   Commander 2nd Class of the Order of the Sword (1 December 1904)
   Knight 1st Class of the Order of the Sword (1896)

Honours
Member of the Royal Swedish Society of Naval Sciences (1891)
Member of the Royal Swedish Academy of War Sciences (1901)

References

1856 births
1909 deaths
Swedish Coastal Artillery major generals
Military personnel from Stockholm
Members of the Royal Swedish Academy of War Sciences
Members of the Royal Swedish Society of Naval Sciences
Commanders First Class of the Order of the Sword
Assassinated military personnel
Deaths by firearm in Sweden
People murdered in Sweden
Burials at Norra begravningsplatsen